Édouard Leguery (8 August 1934 – 16 February 1986) was a French rower. He competed at the 1956 Summer Olympics in Melbourne with the men's eight where they were eliminated in the round one heat.

References

External links 
 

1934 births
1986 deaths
French male rowers
Olympic rowers of France
Rowers at the 1956 Summer Olympics
European Rowing Championships medalists